Events from the year 1751 in Austria

Incumbents
 Monarch – Maria Theresa

Events

 - Banat Military Frontier
 - District of Potisje

Births

 

  
 July 30 (midnight) – Maria Anna Mozart ("Nannerl"), Austrian pianist, singer, composer and violinist, sister of Wolfgang Amadeus Mozart

Deaths

References

 
Years of the 18th century in Austria